Minuscule 7 (in the Gregory-Aland numbering), ε 287 (in Soden numbering), is a Greek minuscule manuscript of the New Testament, on parchment. Palaeographically it has been assigned to the 12th century.

Description 

The codex contains the complete text of the four Gospels on 186 parchment leaves. The text is written in one column per page, 29 lines per page. The capital letters are written in colour, the initial letters are written in red.

There is also a division according to the smaller Ammonian Sections (in Mark 241 sections), with references to the Eusebian Canons.

It contains Prolegomena, synaxaria, Epistula ad Carpianum, the Eusebian Canon tables at the beginning, pictures, Menologion, and lectionary markings at the margin.

Text 

According to Tischendorf it represents the Byzantine text but with some Alexandrian readings.
Kurt Aland did not place it in any Category.
According to the Claremont Profile Method it textual cluster along with the manuscripts 267, 1651, and 1654. The cluster stands close to the textual family Kx.

It belongs to the textual Family 1424.

History 

The manuscript was examined by Wettstein and Scholz. Scholz examined only Mark 1-6 and John 3-8. According to F. H. A. Scrivener it seems to be Stephens' ς'. 
It was examined and described by Paulin Martin. C. R. Gregory saw the manuscript in 1885.

Wettstein gave the number 7 to it.

The codex is currently located at the Bibliothèque nationale de France (Gr. 71) in Paris.

See also 
 List of New Testament minuscules
 Textus Receptus
 Textual criticism
 Minuscule 851 (Gregory-Aland) – some textual relationship in Luke 20

References 

Greek New Testament minuscules
12th-century biblical manuscripts
Bibliothèque nationale de France collections